South Korea has seven highway systems.
 National expressways
 General national highways
Special Metropolitan City roads and Metropolitan City roads
 Local highways
 Si roads
Gun roads
Gu roads

National Expressways 

National Expressways or Expressways

General National highways 

General National highways or National highways

Special Metropolitan City roads and Metropolitan City roads 
Special Metropolitan City roads and Metropolitan City roads

Special Metropolitan City roads 

Special Metropolitan City roads are the highway in the special city (Seoul).

Metropolitan City roads 

Metropolitan City roads are the highway in the metropolitan city.
 Metropolitan City roads of Busan
 Metropolitan City roads of Daegu
 Metropolitan City roads of Incheon
 Metropolitan City roads of Gwangju
 Metropolitan City roads of Daejeon
 Metropolitan City roads of Ulsan

Local highways 

Local highways

State-funded local highways 

State-funded local highways (shortly )

General local highways 

General local highways (

Si roads 
Si roads are the highways in the cities (Si).

Gun roads 
Gun roads are the highways in the counties (Gun).

Gu roads 
Gu roads are the highways in the districts (Gu).

References